Ruensa Haxhiaj (born 19 October 1995), known professionally as Enca, is an Albanian singer.

She rose to fame after releasing "A po t'pëlqen" in 2014, gathering over 100,000 views on YouTube within 24 hours. Haxhia made her music debut in 2012 with "The Best Of" and "Kjo Verë". She later joined Big Basta in Kënga Magjike and continued to work with other acclaimed artists. She participated in Top Fest twice, and reached the semi-finals in her second attempt.
She also participated in Zhurma Show Awards  in 2016, where she won four awards, including the first place.

Life and career 

Ruensa Haxhiaj was born on 19 October 1995 in Tirana to an Albanian Orthodox family.
 She initially started posting covers on YouTube of artists like Lady Gaga, Jessie J, Rita Ora and others. She started using Keek, a social media for video statuses and gained her own fan base. She sang short parts of various songs, posted videos of her daily life, etc. She also participated in the talent show The Voice of Albania in which she failed twice in a row to pass the blind auditions.
Although her debut didn't receive big feedback, she continued working on her solo career, she was featured in many songs of big artists, mainly rappers. She participated in Top Fest twice, in 2013 and 2014. At the 2016 "Zhurma Show Awards", Enca won four awards including "Best Pop","Best Female" with "Dreq" music video and "Internet Prize", "Best Video" with "Bow Down" music video.

Haxhia announced her single "A po t'pëlqen", a Kosovar Gheg penned pop-dance song on Keek. She then released the music video in late-July and received an enormous feedback. Besides her national attention, she also gathered a big number of international fans. The song, which gathered hundreds of thousands of views within its first week.

Discography 

 2012 – "The Best Of"
 2012 – "Kjo Verë"
 2012 – "100" featuring Big Basta & Etnon
 2012 – "All That" feat. Big Basta
 2013 – "Dua të jesh ti", Top Fest 2013.
 2013 – "Jepe Tash"
 2013 – "Real Love" feat. Ardit
 2013 – "E ke rradhën ti"
 2013 – "Baby Girl & Gangsta Boo" feat. B Genius
 2014 – "Ata nuk e din" feat. Noizy
 2014 – "Ishim ne", Top Fest 2014
 2014 – "A po t'pëlqen"
 2014 – Enca & Mozzik "Edhe njo"
 2015 – Soul Killa
 2015 – Call Me Goddess
 2016 – Dreq
 2016 – Bow Down ft. Noizy
 2017 – Love on my body
2017 – Ciao
2018 – Dua
 2018 – Kujt Po I Han feat. Don Phenom
 2018 – Rendez Vous
 2019 – "Balad"
2019 – Hajde ft. Muharrem Ahmeti
2019 – Jealous
 2019 – MWAH
 2020 – " Amor (ft Zaza & Mixey) "
 2020 – "Young and Pretty" – cover
 2020 – "Perhaps" – cover
 2020 – "Ku Mete"
 2020 – "Break Down" (ft. Don Xhoni)
 2021 – "Ndoshta"
 2021 – "Rakia"
2021 – "Suavele"
2022– "Kalle"

Awards and nominations 

Top Music Awards

|-
||2016
||"Enca Haxhia"
|Female Artist of the Year
|
|}

Zhurma Show Awards

|-
||2014
||"A po t'pelqen"
|Best Styling
|
|-
||2015
||"Soul Killa"
|Best Pop
|
|-
|rowspan="5"|2016
|rowspan="2"|"Dreq"
|Best Pop
|
|-
|Best Female
|
|-
|rowspan="3"|"Bow Down"(feat.Noizy)
|Best Song
|
|-
|Best Video/First Prize
|
|-
|Internet Prize
|
|}

References 

1995 births
21st-century Albanian women singers
Albanian actresses
Albanian Internet celebrities
Albanian songwriters
Living people
Musicians from Tirana
Universal Music Group artists